Unionville is an unincorporated community in Georgetown Township, Vermilion County, Illinois, United States. Unionville is located on U.S. Route 150 and Illinois Route 1 along the southern border of Westville.

References

Unincorporated communities in Vermilion County, Illinois
Unincorporated communities in Illinois